Canada is a surname. Notable people with the surname include:

Cody Canada (born 1976), American country singer
Geoffrey Canada (born 1952), American social activist and educator
Jim Canada (1912–1975), American baseball player
Jordin Canada (born 1995), American basketball player
Larry Canada (born 1954), American football player
Matt Canada (born 1972), American football coach
Ron Canada (born 1949), American actor
Tom Canada (born 1980), American football player

See also
David Cañada (born 1975), Spanish cyclist